Psilocybe eximia is a species of psilocybin mushroom in the family Hymenogastraceae. It is found in Java, Indonesia, where it grows in muddy soil among ferns, grasses, moss, and leaf litter. The fungus was described as new to science in 2006 by mycologists Egon Horak and Dennis Desjardin.

See also
List of psilocybin mushrooms
List of Psilocybe species

References

External links

 Type Studies of Psilocybe sensu lato

Entheogens
Fungi described in 2006
Psychoactive fungi
eximia
Psychedelic tryptamine carriers
Fungi of Asia